Come to Dust is a post trip hop album by UK band Second Person.

This is the third and final album from the band, and their first full-length studio release since their debut Chromatography. It was produced by Mark Maclaine (aka The Silence) at The Silence Corporation Studios, London.  Some of the songs on the album were mixed by the Tony Platt.

Trivia 
 Guests on the album include 2006 UK DMC Champion: DJ Muzzel, legendary Jazz trumpeter Jay Phelps, composer/cellist Nicholas Singer, amongst others.
 Directors for the album's videos include Ebba Erikzon, Mina Song, Everton Sebben, and Mark Maclaine.

Track listing 
"Gone Fishing" - 3:46
"The Alphabet Song" - 4:07
"Another Girlfriend" - 3:01
"Paper Umbrella" - 4:17
"Unretractable Facts" - 3:29
"Play Fair" - 3:29
"The Wishbone" - 3:59
"Story With Only Two Characters" - 1:38
"Spilt Milk" - 4:56
"Moth To A Candle Flame" - 2:51
"Four Leaf Clover" - 4:39
"Shadow Of A Doubt" - 2:33
"Giant Steps (Bonus Track)" - 4:27

References
 CDBaby.com
 BBC Radio 2 Interview (The Weekender with Matthew Wright - 3rd Nov 2006)
 The Times Newspaper (UK): Knowledge Section (Saturday 26 Nov 2006)
 Future Music Magazine interview (Nov 2005)

Second Person (band) albums
2011 albums